The elm casebearer moth (Coleophora ulmifoliella) is a moth of the family Coleophoridae. It is found in Canada, including Ontario.

The wingspan is about 13 mm. Adults are tan with grey markings and fringed wings.

The larvae feed on the leaves of Ulmus species. Early instars mine the leaves of their host plant. Later instars feed on the leaves externally from within an oval shaped case. The case is created out of leaves and silk and is about 6 mm in length. They feed on the inner leaf tissues.

Larvae can be in the spring as soon as foliage appears. In the autumn, larvae anchor themselves on to branches in small groups to overwinter. Pupation occurs in early summer and adults appear in midsummer.

References

ulmifoliella
Moths of North America
Moths described in 1946